KSFC (91.9 MHz) in Spokane, Washington, is one of the three non-profit radio stations run by the Spokane Public Radio organization, along with 91.1 KPBX-FM and 90.3 KPBZ.  KSFC broadcasts with an effective radiated power (ERP) of 2,200 watts. It also has an FM translator in Coeur d'Alene, K262CR at 100.3 MHz,  and a full-powered FM repeater in Saint Maries, KXJO at 92.1 MHz.  

KSFC has a format of news and information programming, much of it from National Public Radio (NPR).  It carries some of the same shows as 91.1 KPBX-FM, such as "Morning Edition" and "All Things Considered."  But in middays and evenings when KPBX-FM is airing classical music or jazz, KSFC stays with talk programs.  It airs "All Things Considered" at an early time than KPBX-FM.

History
On , the station first signed on the air.  It was under the supervision of Richi Caldwell as a part of the new radio broadcasting teaching program at the Spokane Falls Community College.  The original power was only 10 watts.

In 1995, Spokane Falls Community College eliminated its teaching program in radio broadcasting as a cost-cutting move.  At this point, KPBX-FM stepped in and bought the station, using it as a full-power translator to serve areas of Spokane where the main signal for KPBX-FM was weak.

On July 1, 1999, KSFC broke off from KPBX to air an expanded format of news and talk programming, including several NPR shows that had previously not been available in the Spokane area.

References

External links
 Spokane Public Radio's website

SFC
NPR member stations
Radio stations established in 1968